"Antes de morirme" (Spanish for "Before I Die") is a song recorded by Spanish rapper C. Tangana featuring Spanish flamenco singer Rosalía. It was written by the performers and produced by Alizzz. The song was released on June 30, 2016 through Sony Music Spain. It is a sleeper hit since it became surprisingly popular in the summer of 2018 after Rosalía began to receive international attention and after it was included in the soundtrack of the first season of the Spanish Netflix show Élite (2018). The song peaked at 26 on the Spanish Music Charts (PROMUSICAE).

Charts

Year-end charts

Release history

References 

2016 songs
2016 singles
Rosalía songs
Songs written by Rosalía